New Beginnings High School is a secondary school located in Indianapolis, Indiana, United States which educates students in grades 9–12. It is an alternative public high school for students who are struggling at their home schools and need a fresh start. Students who attend New Beginnings are identified as "high risk", usually having been expelled or otherwise removed for disciplinary reasons from the regular Indianapolis public school system.

As of 2006, the school principal is Mr. Greg Allen.
Other alternative schools in the area include Roberts Academy and Horizon Middle School.

External links
 New Beginnings High School webpage G

Public high schools in Indiana
Schools in Indianapolis
Alternative schools in the United States